Fort Atkinson High School is a public high school in Fort Atkinson, Wisconsin. It is part of the Fort Atkinson School District.

History
Fort Atkinson High School was founded in 1866, and its first principal was John Purdy. The original school building was destroyed in a fire in 1888. The high school has been housed in a number of buildings since.

Extracurricular activities

Athletics 
Source:
 Boys' and girls' cross country
 Boys' and girls' track
 Boys' and girls' soccer
 Boys' and girls' tennis
 Boys' and girls' swim
 Boys' and girls' basketball
 Boys' and girls' volleyball
 Boys' and girls' golf
 Baseball
 Softball 
 Wrestling
 Football
 Cheerleading/spirit squad
 Esports League

Clubs and organizations 
Source:

Student clubs and organizations include: 
 Archery
 Art league
 Chess club
 FFA 
 Fort Atkinson chapter of the National Speech and Debate Association
 Forensics
 French club
 FBLA
 German club
 History club
 Math club
 NHS
 Spanish club
 VICA

Fort Atkinson has two competitive show choirs, the mixed-gender South High Street Singers and the women's-only Lexington Singers. The school also hosts its own competition, the Fort Atkinson Showcase.

The Fort Atkinson Debate Team is led by English teacher Dan Hansen in the high school, the team competes from October to late January every year, but practice starts in September. The team was founded in 2016 and has seven members as of 2021.

See also 
 List of high schools in Wisconsin

References 

Public high schools in Wisconsin
Education in Jefferson County, Wisconsin
1866 establishments in Wisconsin
Educational institutions established in 1866